Holophrastic indeterminacy, or indeterminacy of sentence translation, is one of two kinds of indeterminacy of translation to appear in the writings of philosopher W. V. O. Quine. According to Quine, "there is more than one correct method of translating sentences where the two translations differ not merely in the meanings attributed to the sub-sentential parts of speech but also in the net import of the whole sentence". It is holophrastic indeterminacy that underlies Quine's argument against synonymy, the basis of his objections to Rudolf Carnap's analytic/synthetic distinction. Another kind of indeterminacy introduced by Quine is the "inscrutability of reference", which refers to parts of a sentence or individual words.

Indeterminacy of translation

Quine's work on indeterminacy of translation, stemming from the basic forms of indeterminacy, is widely discussed in modern analytic philosophy:

Quine's approach to translation, radical translation, takes the perspective of trying to establish the meaning of sentences in a foreign language by observing and questioning native speakers of that language.  It is a hypothetical version of what could be an empirical investigation. By an armchair analysis of such an adventure, Quine argues that it is impossible to construct a unique translation that can be defended as better than all others. The reason is predicated upon an argued unavoidable introduction of the two indeterminacies above. According to Hilary Putnam, it is “what may well be the most fascinating and the most discussed philosophical argument since Kant’s Transcendental Deduction of the Categories”.

Naturalized epistemology

Holophrastic indeterminacy is important to the understanding of Quine's naturalized epistemology. As Quine states his thesis:

Quine's naturalized epistemology in brief is the view that instead of traditional attempts to connect how our beliefs relate to evidence, epistemology should focus upon how experience leads to beliefs: the causal connections between our sensory evidence and our beliefs about the world. .

See also
Analytic–synthetic distinction
Duhem–Quine thesis
Meta-ontology
Naturalized epistemology
Two Dogmas of Empiricism

References

Further reading

External links 

20th-century philosophy
Philosophy of language
Willard Van Orman Quine